Wesley Oliveira da Silva (6 September 1988), also known as Wesley Safadão, is a Brazilian singer, songwriter, producer and businessman. 

He began singing at the age of fifteen, and began his professional career by joining a family band: Garota Safada. As of 2007, it became popular in the northeast region and in 2015 with the hit "Camarote" it reached national success along with his first solo album: Ao Vivo em Brasilia. In his solo career, he released more hit songs such as "Coração Machucado", "Meu Coração Deu Pt", "Ninguém É de Ferro", "Air Conditioning no 15", "Aquele 1%" and "Você Partiu Meu Coração". Since its first national success, it has had one of the most expensive fees in Brazil.

Discography

Studio albums

Videography

Singles
"Camarote" (2015)
"Parece Que o Vento" feat. Ivete Sangalo (2015)
"Coração Machucado" (2016)
"Solteiro de Novo" feat. Ronaldinho Gaúcho (2016)
"Meu Coração deu PT" feat. Matheus & Kauan (2016)
"Ninguém é de Ferro" feat. Marília Mendonça (2017)
"Ressaca de Saudade" (2017)
"Ar Condicionado no 15" (2017)
"Sonhei Que Tava Me Casando" (2017)
"Romance com Safadeza" feat. Anitta (2018)
"Só Pra Castigar" (2018)
"Igual Ela, Só Uma" (2019)

Collaborations

"Fim de Festa" with Saia Rodada (2008)
"Nada Sou Sem Você" with Pisada de Bakana (2009)
"Playboyzinho Da Facu" with Forró Estourado (2010)
"Homem Mudado" with Banda Santroppê (2010)
"O Verão Chegou" with Forró di Taipa (2010)
"Balada" with Novo Balancear (2011)
"Quando Eu Parar de Ligar" with Banda Rabo de Vaca (2011)
"Empinadinha" with Léo Santana (Parangolé) (2012)
"Solte o Som do Paredão" with Forró dos Balas (2012)
"Tô Pensando em Você" with Forró Esfregue Dance (2012)
"Ninguém Vive Sem Amor" with Forró Boca A Boca (2012)
"A Gente Já Rola" with Simone & Simaria (2012)
"Sou Forrozeiro" with Pegada de Luxo (2012)
"Nem de Graça Quero Seu Amor" with Forró da Curtição (2012)
"Fatos e Relatos" with Caviar Com Rapadura (2012)
"100% Amor" with Alinne Rosa (Cheiro de Amor) (2012)
"Tentativas Em Vão" with Bruno & Marrone (2012)
"Só Sei Te Amar" with Bruno & Marrone (2012)
"Sou Outra Pessoa" with Dorgival Dantas (2012)
"É Só Chegar e Beijar" with DJ João Brasil (2012)
"Pede Pra Mim" with Forró do Chefão (2012)
"Caranguejo" with Toca do Vale (2012)
"Nheco Nheco" with Forró do Movimento (2012)
"Vai Querendo" with Forró da Curtição (2013)
"Em Outras Palavras" with Forró 100% (2013)
"Amor Errado" with Banda Magníficos (2013)
"Sintomas de Amor" with Filhinho de Papai (2013)
"Senta Ana Tereza" with Bota Pra Moer (2013)
"Pancadão Frenético" with Claudia Leitte (2013)
"Sua Linda" with Lucas Lucco (2014)
"Sou Ciumento Mesmo" with Fernando & Sorocaba (2014)
"iDento" with PP Júnior and Chicabana (2014)
"Tó Sou Seu" with Fred & Gustavo (2014)
"Mal Acompanhado" with Forró da Curtição (2014)
"Ah, Tá Sofrendo" with Humberto & Ronaldo (2014)
"Eu Vou Pagar Pra Ver" with Xand (Aviões do Forró) (2014)
"Sofrência" with Forró do Movimento (2014)
"Gelo Na Balada" with Cavaleiros do Forró (2014)
"Sino de Belém" with Michel Teló (2014)
"Solteiro Desapegado" with Cleber & Cauan (2014)
"Agora Me Curei" with Simone & Simaria (2015)

References

External links
 

1988 births
Living people
21st-century Brazilian male singers
21st-century Brazilian singers
People from Fortaleza